Susanne Craig  is a Canadian investigative journalist who works at The New York Times. She was the reporter who illegally mailed Donald Trump's 1995 tax returns during the 2016 presidential election. In 2018, she was an author of The New York Times investigation into Donald Trump's wealth that found the president inherited hundreds of millions of dollars from his father, some through fraudulent tax schemes. She won the Pulitzer Prize for Explanatory Reporting in 2019 for this coverage. In 2020, she further reported on Donald Trump tax record which disclosed that he paid $750 in federal income tax during 2016 and nothing at all in 10 of the previous 15 years. Craig is also known for her coverage of the financial crisis of 2007–2008 and of New York State and New York City government and politics.

Early life and education
Craig was born in Calgary, Alberta, and attended the University of Calgary, graduating in 1991 with a B.A. in Political Science and Government.

Career
Craig began her career as a summer intern for the Calgary Herald in 1990, and was a summer intern for the Windsor Star 1991; her first full-time job was as a reporter for the Windsor Star in Windsor, Ontario.

She originally wrote for The Globe and Mail before becoming a staff writer for the Wall Street Journal. In 2010 she joined the New York Times to continue reporting on Wall Street and was later promoted to bureau chief for coverage of the New York State government.<ref>{{cite web|title=Journal'''s Susanne Craig Jumps to New York Times DealBook Section|url=https://nymag.com/daily/intelligencer/2010/08/journals_susanne_craig_jumps_t.html|url-status=live|access-date=23 September 2016|publisher=New York Magazine}}</ref> In 2015, Craig left Albany to become the Times' New York City Hall bureau chief.

She is the recipient of the National Newspaper Award in Canada (Business - 1999) and several Gerald Loeb Awards. Additionally, she was the lead journalist on a team that was a finalist for a Pulitzer Prize for National Affairs Reporting in relation to coverage of the Lehman Brothers and their role in the financial crisis of 2008.

On October 1, 2016 the New York Times'' published an article co-authored by Craig, which stated that Donald Trump had reported a loss of $916 million in 1995, which could have allowed him to avoid paying income taxes for up to eighteen years. In subsequent television interviews, Craig identified herself as the reporter who had received a portion of Trump's 1995 tax records in her mailbox from an anonymous sender. In 2019 she and two other reporters shared the Pulitzer Prize for Explanatory Reporting for "an exhaustive 18-month investigation of President Donald Trump’s finances that debunked his claims of self-made wealth and revealed a business empire riddled with tax dodges". On September 27, 2020, she and others further reported on Trump's tax record, exposing that Trump paid $750 in federal income tax during 2016 and no income taxes at all in 10 of the previous 15 years.

Awards

 1999 National Newspaper Award
 2004 Gerald Loeb Award for Deadline Writing shared with Ianthe Jeanne Dugan and Theo Frances for "The Day Grasso Quit as NYSE Chief"
 2008 Gerald Loeb Award for Beat Writing for "Breakdown at Bear Stearns"
 2009 Gerald Loeb Award for Breaking News for "The Day That Changed Wall Street"
 2019 Pulitzer Prize for Explanatory Reporting shared with David Barstow and Russ Buettner for the New York Times.
 2019 George Polk Award for Political Reporting, shared with the same two colleagues.

References

Year of birth missing (living people)
Living people
Canadian investigative journalists
University of Calgary alumni
Writers from Calgary
The New York Times writers
The Wall Street Journal people
Canadian expatriate journalists in the United States
Gerald Loeb Award winners for Deadline and Beat Reporting
Gerald Loeb Award winners for Breaking News
Pulitzer Prize for Explanatory Journalism winners